Seo Hyang-soon (born July 8, 1967) is a female South Korean archer and Olympic champion. She competed at the 1984 Summer Olympics in Los Angeles, where she won an individual gold medal at the age of seventeen. She became Korea's first female gold medalist.

She moved to the United States in  2004, where she teaches archery at her own archery school in Irvine, California. Her husband is Park Kyung-ho, who won a gold medal in judo at the 1986 Asian Games. They have three children, their eldest daughter, Park Seong-min (박성민) is a professional golfer.

References

External links
 
 

1967 births
Living people
South Korean female archers
Olympic archers of South Korea
Archers at the 1984 Summer Olympics
Olympic gold medalists for South Korea
Olympic medalists in archery
Medalists at the 1984 Summer Olympics
20th-century South Korean women